Count Walerian Skorobohaty Krasiński or Valerian Krasinski (1795 – 22 December 1855) was a Polish Calvinist  historian and jurnalist born in Republic of Belarus.    
Krasinski was a Polish aristocrat in exile after the November Uprising 1830, during the Austrian, German and Russian partition of Poland. In 1844, he was proposed for a chair in Slavonic Studies at Oxford University. In 1848, he presented appeals to the Habsburg government. In Russia and Europe, or, The probable consequences of the present war he wrote on the Crimean War.

Krasinski's Historical sketch of the rise, progress, and decline of the Reformation in Poland (1838) still one of main texts on the subject available in English, was written in English. One of Krasinski's main sources is Slavonia reformata (1679) by Andreas Vengerscius.

He died in Edinburgh and is buried in the Warriston Cemetery close to another Polish exile, the violinist and composer Feliks Janiewicz, one of the co-organisers of the first Edinburgh Festival. The grave is marked by a tall grey granite obelisk. It lies in the overgrown area (2014) to the south-west, around 50m east of the more accessible monument to Horatio McCulloch.

Works
 The present government of Russia:  the Emperor Nicholas, article 1841
 Russia and Europe, or, The probable consequences of the present war

 Monachologia, Or, Handbook Of The Natural History Of Monks: Arranged According To The Linnean System Ignaz Edler Von Born and Walerian Krasinski.
 English translation of Calvin's Treatise on Relics.
 Panslavism and Germanism 1848

 Montenegro and the Slavonians in Turkey 1853
 The Polish Question and panslavism 1855
 Poland, its history, constitution, literature etc. 1855

References

External links

 
 

1780 births
1855 deaths
19th-century Polish historians
Polish male non-fiction writers
Burials at Warriston Cemetery
Counts of Poland
Polish emigrants to the United Kingdom
Polish Calvinist and Reformed Christians
Polish politicians
Polish political writers